Frank B. (Buster) Brouillet (May 18, 1928 – January 20, 2001) was an American politician and educator in the state of Washington. He served in the Washington House of Representatives from 1957 to 1973. He also served as Washington's superintendent of public instruction. Brouillet Elementary School in Puyallup, WA, is named in his honor.

References

1928 births
2001 deaths
Washington (state) Superintendents of Public Instruction
Democratic Party members of the Washington House of Representatives